BTB/POZ domain-containing protein KCTD13 is a protein that in humans is encoded by the KCTD13 gene.

Interactions 

KCTD13 has been shown to interact with PCNA.

Clinical relevance 
Mutations in this gene have been associated to abnormalities in brain growth and behaviour.

References

Further reading

External links 
 PDBe-KB provides an overview of all the structure information available in the PDB for Human KCTD13